Otidocephalini is a tribe of antlike weevils in the family of beetles known as Curculionidae. There are at least 3 genera and 20 described species in Otidocephalini.

Genera
These three genera belong to the tribe Otidocephalini:
 Micromyrmex Sleeper, 1953 i c g b
 Myrmex Sturm, 1826 i c g b
 Oopterinus Casey, 1892 i c g b
Data sources: i = ITIS, c = Catalogue of Life, g = GBIF, b = Bugguide.net

References

Further reading

External links

 

Curculioninae